Siavash Saminia  (born 17 March 1979) is an Iranian former professional footballer who played for as a defender. He has appeared with Indian I-League giants Churchill Brothers and Dempo SC.

External links
 http://goal.com/en-india/people/iran-islamic-republic-of/36369/siavash-saminia

Iranian footballers
1979 births
Living people
Salgaocar FC players
Iranian expatriates in India
Expatriate footballers in India
Churchill Brothers FC Goa players
People from Tehran
I-League players
Association football fullbacks
Iranian expatriate sportspeople in India